Bernard Cunniffe was an English professional rugby league footballer who played in the 1930s and 1940s.

Playing career

International honours
Bernard Cunniffe won a cap for England while at Castleford in 1937 against France, and won a cap for Great Britain while at Castleford in 1937 against Australia.

County honours
Bernard Cunniffe won caps for Yorkshire while at Castleford, he played , i.e. number 2, in the 16-10 victory over Cumberland at Workington Town's stadium on 10 October 1936, the 6-28 defeat by Lancashire at Castleford's stadium on 21 October 1936, the 4-8 defeat by Australia at Bradford Northern's stadium on 6 October 1937, and the 9-10 defeat by Lancashire at Rochdale Hornets' stadium on 12 February 1938.

County League appearances
Bernard Cunniffe played in Castleford's victory in the Yorkshire County League during the 1938–39 season .

Challenge Cup Final appearances
Bernard Cunniffe played , i.e. number 2, and scored a try in Castleford's 11-8 victory over Huddersfield in the 1935 Challenge Cup Final during the 1934–35 season at Wembley Stadium, London on Saturday 4 May 1935, in front of a crowd of 39,000.

References

External links
(archived by web.archive.org) Profile at thecastlefordtigers.co.uk

Castleford Tigers players
England national rugby league team players
English rugby league players
Great Britain national rugby league team players
Place of birth missing
Place of death missing
Rugby league centres
Rugby league wingers
Year of birth missing
Year of death missing
Yorkshire rugby league team players